Justin Hansford (born 1981) is an associate professor of law at Howard University School of Law and Executive Director of the Thurgood Marshall Civil Rights Center. Hansford was previously a democracy project fellow at Harvard University, a visiting professor of law at Georgetown University Law Center, and an associate professor of law at the Saint Louis University School of Law.

Education and career 
Hansford received his B.A. from Howard University and his J.D. from Georgetown University Law Center. While a law student at Georgetown, he founded The Georgetown Journal of Law and Modern Critical Race Perspectives.

Ferguson to Geneva 
Hansford immediately became involved in the legal efforts and political protests following the death of Michael Brown in 2015. One of his most prominent efforts was to write a human rights shadow report for a group he helped create, Ferguson to Geneva, that traveled to Switzerland to present their report.  Hansford's "rebellious," hands-on advocacy in the justice movement has been written about by Howard law professor Harold McDougall in his article, "The Rebellious Law Professor: Combining Cause and Reflective Lawyering."

Justice for Marcus Garvey 
Hansford is part of the leadership team for Justice for Garvey, an effort to posthumously pardon famed civil rights leader Marcus Garvey and exonerate him from his 1923 prosecution to mail fraud which has been argued to have been politically and racially motivated by J. Edgar Hoover and others. He co-authored a piece for The Root on the project: "Black History Matters: Why President Obama Should Pardon Marcus Garvey."

References 

1981 births
Living people
Howard University alumni
Howard University School of Law faculty
Georgetown University Law Center alumni
Saint Louis University School of Law faculty